The Knight at All Times (უჟამო ჟამის რაინდი) is a 1999 Georgian-language novel-menippea by author Miho Mosulishvili.

Outline
This extensive work (approximately 95 700  words)  reflects the spiritual state of Georgia during the last two centuries (1801–1993), and it’s read with inextinguishable  interest. The author together with the protagonist of the novel, Vache Andronikashvili is looking for The Knight of All Times, and the  reader also  is looking for him.

The genre of the novel as identified by the author as Menippea.

The novel is a mixture of eccentric and scandalous events that ends with  Carnival – one of the main character of menippea – which brought together the living and the dead.

Novel time – background covers Georgia's spiritual adventure in the 19th and 20th centuries. This a small country aspiration for independence from the Russian Empire; or this is the adventure of  a family, the story of Andronikashvili’s seven generations from Russian Empire's annexation (1801)  until Abkhazian war (1993).

The author's narrative is based on approved historical references and sources, and it follows the testimony of  chronicles. So the reader has a convincing feeling of real events. Not only the historical and fictional characters, but the gravestones have spoken and we see the scenes of the heroic past lively.

The novel is built on cinematographic principle of  the parallel narrative: it describes the persecution and destruction of members of the secret organization “Giorgi” in 1983 by State Security Committee (KGB) officers; on the other hand, there are tragicomic or dramatic episodes of seven ancestors of Papua Andronikashvili, and we see what happened to this noble Georgian family after Russian Empire invasion (1801) in Georgia.

Local or worldwide memorable stories are described by the skilled writer, who feels perfectly nuances and their  capacities. Good example of above is the passage with terrible story of beheading of the priest Zirak, Gija and Datia. Unmerciful attorney of KGB enjoys the spectacle: he forces his subordinates to roll the heads downhill to see which one is faster and to amuse himself. Mihko Mosulishvili acknowledges, that this is the real story – the same terrible fact took place in the village Arashenda, when the Bolsheviks conquered  Georgia for second time in 1921, and it happened to the ancestors of the author.

The depressed hero of Abkhazian war (1992–1993) Papua Andronikashvili decides to commit suicide and the imaginary, strange guest – Archimandrite Iostos Andronikashvili prevents him. Cleric brings his  descendant the book, written by himself  – “The Chest of Mystery” and tells him the ancestors’ order – to postpone the suicide until he finds The Knight at All Times.

From this moment the novel continues in two dimensions: on the one hand further developments can be considered as an image of objective reality, and on the other as the shifts in Papua Andronikashvili’s soul. He is the only man, who stayed alive in the novel – and the protagonist is visited by already dead ancestors and their contemporaries.

The Chest of Mystery, created by sinful hand of archimandrite Iostos is bound organically in the plot of the novel. The patrimonial chronicles of Shishioni, or Andronikashvili are told in different languages. According to the book, the eternal existing is ordered by god on the  generation of shishions with green eyes and the book tells that the age of domination of the Scythians is to be ended by seven generations of Shishions (Scythians were called the Russian invaders in Georgia).

In 1983 the secret organization “Giorgi” and the members of this organization  set a goal of freeing their homeland from the rule of Russia through  the peaceful disobedience. Their conspirative activities – editing of the journal “Amirani”, preparation for spreading  leaflets and the secret meetings did not escape from the watchful eye of KGB, based on distrust and seeking the victims. The loyal officials of expansionist policy of the orthodox Russia value the personal benefit and career more than the independence of the insulted country, so they guard and pursue the young people, who dream of freedom of their homeland, the KGB officers plan their arrest and enjoy the results of their gendarmes activities in advance. Immoral and greedy Russian doesn’t disdain anything, struggling explicitly or implicitly against the people who seek the ways to freedom.

In the vision of dying Vache, who climbed on the eaves of the abandoned church and was shot by KGB snipers seven descendants of great and incomparable warrior Mahkaz Andronikashvili merged into a single entity and fought the biblical dragon...

Only after viewing the enchanting and fantastic carnival (where the Russian writers Fyodor Dostoyevsky and Leo Tolstoy demand from Georgia to liberate Russia from colonial oppression (we are dealing with a situation typical of the carnival, when the opposite is true), the reader finds himself the main character of the novel – yes,  in the novel the reader is The Knight at All Times, who has to fight the biblical dragon – or to try to overcome the evil in his own soul and if he can’t win, at least to weaken it. This is the most important idea of the novel.

Characters

 Papua Andronikashvili
 Iostos Andronikashvili
 Malkhaz Andronikashvili — (1773—1822)
 Ivane Andronikashvili — (1798–1868)
 Archil Andronikashvili — (1833–1863)
 Solomon andronikashvili
 Suslika Andronikashvili
 Anneta Andronikashvili — (1892–1916); Anneta Andronikashvili was a trained nurse on the  during the First World War. On  the ship was sunk by a torpedo from the German U-boat . Andronikashvili bowed others their rescue unit, and so died.
 Paata Andronikashvili
 Vache Andronikashvili
 Sulamit Abashidze
 Dachi Ochiauri
 Kakha Iamanidze
 Gela Jorjikia
 Esiko Isarlishvili
 Mikheil Shulman
 Natalia Avalishvili
And others.

Awards
 December 28, 1998 – The first prize winner in literary award of Tbilisi city administration, Management of youth affairs and the union of book-fans "Bestseller"

Release details
 1999, Georgia, უჟამო ჟამის რაინდი, Pub. date 2 January 1999, paperback (First edition)

References

External links
 Carnival of live and dead characters
 Užamo žamis raindi : romani-menipea
 Užamo žamis raindi
 Carnival of live and dead characters (Review by Nino Kajaia)

Literature of Georgia (country)
1999 novels
20th-century Georgian novels
Satirical novels
Adventure novels
Postmodern novels
Georgian magic realism novels
Works by Miho Mosulishvili